The 2022–23 FA Cup is the 142nd edition of the oldest football tournament in the world, the Football Association Challenge Cup. It is a one-legged competition whereby teams play each other once and the winner proceeds to the next round, in contrast to a two-legged competition in which teams play each other twice (home and away) to determine which team progresses to the next round. 
The FA Cup is sponsored by Emirates and known as the Emirates FA Cup for sponsorship purposes. The winners will qualify for the 2023–24 UEFA Europa League group stage.
 
Premier League team Liverpool were the defending champions, having defeated Chelsea to secure their 8th title in the previous year's final, but they were eliminated in the fourth round by Brighton & Hove Albion.

Teams
The FA Cup is a knockout competition with 124 teams taking part all trying to reach the Final at Wembley on 3 June 2023. The competition consisted of the 92 teams from the Football League system (20 teams from the Premier League and the 72 in total from the EFL Championship, EFL League One and EFL League Two) plus the 32 surviving teams out of 640 teams from the National League System (all but eleven clubs from 5–9 and eleven replacements from tier 10 of the English football league system) that started the competition in the qualifying rounds.

Qualification rounds are on a geographical basis and main competition rounds drawn randomly usually either at the completion of the previous round or on the evening of the last televised game of a round being played depending on television broadcasting rights.

Qualifying

Teams that are not members of either the Premier League or English Football League compete in the qualifying rounds to secure one of 32 available places in the First Round Proper.

On 6 August 2022, Newport (IOW) teenager Finn Smith became the youngest ever FA Cup goalscorer, a day after his 16th birthday.

First Round Proper
The first round saw the 32 winners from the fourth qualifying round joined by the 48 clubs from League One and League Two. The draw was made on 17 October 2022 by Dion Dublin and Alan Smith. The round included six teams from the seventh tier, the lowest-ranked teams remaining in the competition: Alvechurch, Bracknell Town, Coalville Town, Merthyr Town, Needham Market, and South Shields.

Second Round Proper
The draw for the second round was made on 7 November 2022 by Jermaine Beckford and Mickey Thomas, consisting of the 40 winners from the previous round. The round contained one team from the seventh tier, Alvechurch, who defeated EFL League One club Cheltenham Town in the first round.

Third Round Proper
The draw for the third round was made on 28 November 2022, consisting of the 20 winners from the previous round, all 20 members of the Premier League and the 24 EFL Championship clubs. The round included three teams from the fifth tier, the lowest-ranked teams remaining in the competition: Chesterfield, Boreham Wood, and Wrexham.

Fourth Round Proper
The draw for the fourth round was made on 8 January 2023, consisting of the 32 winners from the previous round. The round included one team from the fifth tier, the lowest-ranked team remaining in the competition: Wrexham.

Fifth Round Proper
The draw for the fifth round took place on 30 January 2023 on The One Show at Broadcasting House in Portland Place. The matches took place in the week commencing 27 February 2023. This round included one team from the fourth tier, the lowest-ranked team remaining in the competition: Grimsby Town.

Quarter-finals
The draw for the quarter-finals took place on 1 March 2023.
This round included one team from the fourth tier, the lowest-ranked team remaining in the competition: Grimsby Town. Grimsby were the first fourth-tier side to reach the quarter-finals since Cambridge United in 1990.

Semi-finals
The draw for the semi-finals took place on 19 March 2023 on BBC One, after Brighton & Hove Albion's victory over Grimsby Town. This round, decided in one match, which will be played at Wembley Stadium, includes one team from the second-tier EFL Championship: Sheffield United.

Final

Top scorers

Television rights
Both of these broadcasters will air the tournament until the 2024–25 season. In addition, FA Cup matches may also be streamed on ESPN+.

Additional matches featuring Welsh clubs may feature on BBC Wales or on Welsh language channel S4C.

References

 

 
FA Cup seasons
FA Cup
FA Cup